Craig Miller is a former CEO of Ruth's Chris Steak House. He ran an unsuccessful campaign as a 2010 candidate for the U.S. House of Representatives. He also was a candidate in the 2012 U.S. Senate elections to be a senator representing Florida. On January 12, 2012, Miller's candidacy was endorsed by Herman Cain. During this time, Miller also endorsed Cain's 9–9–9 Plan.

Education 
Miller graduated from Rockledge High School in 1967. He holds a business degree from the University of Central Florida.

Career 
Miller served in the Air Force as a pilot.

In 1984, Miller joined Pizzeria Uno and became president of the company in 1986. In 1996, Miller became CEO of Uno Restaurant Corp. Miller left Uno in 2001.

In March 2004, he became CEO of Ruth's Chris Steak House. Miller was let go from Ruth's Chris in 2008 when the company was struggling financially.

In 2010, Miller ran in the Republican primary for an Orlando-area congressional seat. In July 2011, Miller announced his candidacy for the Florida Senate race to replace Bill Nelson.

References

External links
 Miller's 2012 Senate Campaign website

American chief executives of food industry companies
University of Central Florida alumni
Living people
Florida Republicans
Year of birth missing (living people)